Arnold Butler (by 1521 – 17 May 1564), of Johnston, Pembrokeshire, was a Welsh politician.

He was a Member (MP) of the Parliament of England for Pembrokeshire in April 1554 and November 1554.

References

1564 deaths
People from Pembrokeshire
Members of the Parliament of England (pre-1707) for constituencies in Wales
English MPs 1554
English MPs 1554–1555
Year of birth uncertain